My Way is a posthumous compilation album with music by Dutch rock and roll and blues artist Herman Brood, released shortly after his suicide on 11 July 2001. The album produced a number one single, the first of Brood's career: "My Way" reached number one on 18 August 2001. On the Dutch album chart, the album reached #5 on 20 October 2001, and stayed on the chart for 57 weeks. It was certified gold in 2002.

Track listing

Singles
"My Way" reached number one on 18 August 2001 and stayed there for three weeks, spending 14 weeks on the chart.

Personnel
Herman Brood - piano, keyboard, vocals
Monica Tjen Akwoei - vocals
Bertus Borgers - saxophone
Freddy Cavalli - bass
Josee van Iersel - vocals
Danny Lademacher - guitar
Ani Meerman - drums
Robert Jan Stips - keyboards
Floor van Zutphen - vocals
Robin Freeman - sound engineer

References 

Herman Brood & His Wild Romance albums
Compilation albums published posthumously
2001 compilation albums
Bertelsmann Music Group compilation albums